Stanley Donald Stookey (May 23, 1915 – November 4, 2014) was an American inventor. He had 60 patents in his name related to glass and ceramics, some patents solely his and others shared as joint patents with other inventors. His discoveries and inventions have contributed to the development of ceramics, eyeglasses, sunglasses, cookware, defense systems, and electronics.

He was a research director at Corning Glass Works for 47 years doing R&D in glass and ceramic development. His inventions include Fotoform, CorningWare, Cercor, Pyroceram and Photochromic Ophthalmic glass eyewear.

Early life
Stookey was born on May 23, 1915 in Hay Springs, Nebraska, the eldest of four children born to Stanley and Hermie Stookey. Both of his parents were teachers, and his father also worked at some point in time as a bank clerk. When Stookey was about 6 years old, the family moved to Cedar Rapids, Iowa.

Career
Stookey went to Coe College from 1934 to 1936, where he graduated with his first degree, a liberal arts degree in chemistry and mathematics. Stookey’s grandfather (Stephen Stookey) was once a professor of botany and geology at that same college. After graduation from Coe College, Stookey went to Lafayette College in Easton, Pennsylvania in 1937. He received a $1000 fellowship to cover living expenses and as a teaching laboratory assistant in the chemistry lab. In 1938, he earned his Master of Science degree in chemistry from Lafayette College. Stookey then went to Massachusetts Institute of Technology in Cambridge where he received a doctorate in chemistry in 1940. The same year, he married his wife Ruth. He received an honorary degree from Alfred University in 1984.

Stookey took his career job at Corning Glass Works in 1940. He carried out research on glass and ceramics, which led to several inventions. Stookey studied and experimented with opal glass and glass ceramics.

FotoForm glass

One of Stookey's earliest innovations was FotoForm glass. The scientific community recognized its value around 1948. FotoForm glass is used in computer manufacturing and communications technology. A serendipitous invention made by Stookey in 1953 was when he took a piece of FotoForm glass and mistakenly heated it to 900 °C when he meant to heat it to 600 °C. When an oven thermometer was stuck on the higher temperature, Stookey had accidentally created the first glass-ceramic, Fotoceram. It was later known also as Pyroceram. This was the first glass-ceramic and eventually led to the development of CorningWare in 1957. CorningWare went to the consumer marketplace the next year in 1958 for cookware by Corning Glass Works and became just one of Stookey's multimillion-dollar inventions. It influenced the development of VisionWare, which is transparent cookware. VisionWare was patented by Corning Glass Works in 1966.

Pyroceramic glass has the necessary properties to be used by the military for the nose cones of supersonic radar domes in guided missiles applied in defense. It has the special properties of extreme hardness, super strength, resistance to high heat and transparency to radar waves. It is the basis for Gorilla Glass, used in iPhones and other LCD screens.

Stookey also developed photochromic glass. Photochromic glass is a glass that is used to make ophthalmic lenses that darken in bright light. These lenses were first available to consumers in the 1960s as sunglasses made by Corning Glass Works. It was a joint discovery and development of Stookey with William Armistead. Stookey also invented photosensitive glass using gold in which permanent colored photographs can be produced.

Timeline
1936 Magna cum laude, Coe College
1937 Master of Science in chemistry, Lafayette College
1940 Ph.D., physical chemistry, Massachusetts Institute of Technology
1950 First of 60 U.S. Patents Awarded, No. 2.515.937 for photosensitive glass.
1953 John Price Wetherill Medal, Franklin Institute
1955 Alumni Award of Merit, Coe College
1960 Ross Coffin Purdy Award, American Ceramic Society
1962 John Price Wetherill Medal, Franklin Institute (2nd time)
1963 Honorary doctor of science degree in 1963, Coe College.
1964 Toledo Glass and Ceramic Award
1970 Inventor of the Year, George Washington University
1971 Award for Creative Invention, American Chemical Society
1971 E.C. Sullivan Award, Corning Section, American Ceramic Society
1973 Beverly Myers Achievement Award, Educational Foundation in Ophthalmic Optics
1975 American Phoenix Award of the Glass Industry
1979 IRI Achievement Award, Industrial Research Institute
1982 Samuel Giejsbeek Award, Pacific Coast Sections, ACerS
1984 Distinguished Inventor Award, Central New York Patent Law Association
1984 Honorary doctor of science degree, Alfred University
1985 Published "Journey to the Center of the Crystal Ball", an autobiography
1986 United States Medal of Technology presented by President Ronald Reagan
1989 Distinguished Life Member, American Ceramic Society
1993 Wilhelm Eitel Medallion for Excellence in Silicate Science
1994 National Medal of Technology, White House Council
2010 Inducted into National Inventors Hall of Fame

Later life
Stookey retired from Corning Glass Works in 1987 after a career of 47 years.

Together he and his wife raised three children named Robert, Margaret and Donald Bruce. They had six grandchildren and eight great-grandchildren. He died at the age of 99 in 2014.

Organization membership
Stookey held membership in many professional organizations and societies, including:

 Sigma Xi
 National Academy of Engineering
 British Society of Glass Technology
 American Institute of Chemical Engineers (Fellow)
 The American Ceramic Society (Distinguished Life and Fellow)
 A section on the innovations of glass and glass-ceramics at the Corning Museum of Glass with a Stookey video describing his glass-ceramics inventions.

Bibliography

References

American chemists
Glass makers
Glass-ceramics
Inorganic chemists
1915 births
2014 deaths
Corning Inc.
People from Cedar Rapids, Iowa
People from Sheridan County, Nebraska
Coe College alumni
Lafayette College alumni
Massachusetts Institute of Technology School of Science alumni
Writers from Iowa
Writers from Nebraska
Fellows of the American Ceramic Society